Something Like You is a 2001 song by NSYNC, coproduced and co-written by group vocal couch Robin Wiley for the album Celebrity.

Production 

Stevie Wonder played harmonica on the track. Timberlake and Wiley enlisted Wonder after writing the harmonica part. during recording Timberlake informed Wonder that he was playing the final note flat.

Critical reception 
EW wrote the song was a "the squishy ballad with drooling-puppy harmonies and lyrics", and gave it a D-rating. Variety deemed it "so-so". Billboard felt the "slushy" song had an "eyeroll-worthy lyric" and "corny harmonica riff", though positively compared it to Boyz II Men hit 4 Seasons of Loneliness. ABC suggested that Wonder was actively choosing to contribute to "studio-produced pop" whereas other may have declined. Daily Collegian was also surprised that Wonder contributed to the track. Slant Magazine felt that in comparison with Boyz II Men, the song was "watered-down pop than classic soul", and a sign of the "classic hit-making formula" of old rather than the new experimental pop direction the band was exploring.

References 

2001 songs
NSYNC songs